Gurmit Singh Virk Chainchal Singh (born 24 March 1965;) is a Singaporean actor, comedian, presenter, and television personality. He was prominently a full-time Mediacorp artiste from 1994 to 2014. A former artiste of Mediacorp, he is best known for his role as the titular character Phua Chu Kang in Phua Chu Kang Pte Ltd, Phua Chu Kang Sdn Bhd and Phua Chu Kang The Movie, for which he won the Asian Television Awards prize for Best Performance by an Actor (Comedy) five times, from 1998 to 2001 and in 2003 for the former. From 2004 to 2005, he won the Highly Commended prize.

Life
Born to a Sikh Indian father, Chainchal Singh, and an East Asian (Chinese–Japanese) mother, Gurmit was brought up as a Sikh, but converted to Christianity in 1985. Gurmit Singh studied in Outram Secondary School during his secondary school years.

Gurmit is married to Melissa, a Cantonese Chinese. They have three children, Gabrielle (born 1997), Elliot (born 2002) and Mikaela (born 2013). Gurmit is an alumnus of National Police Cadet Corps, Singapore, and held the rank of Cadet Inspector.

Career
Making his debut in the variety show Live on 5 in 1994, he then became the host and lead actor of sitcom Gurmit's World, also debuted in 1994. The second season of Gurmit's World, continued in 1995, in which Gurmit portrayed his 'relatives' in a series of skits (unlike the first season where he played a wide assortment of mostly non-recurring characters), featured the first appearance of a character named Phua Chu Kang. The Singlish-based spin-off sitcom Phua Chu Kang Pte Ltd in 1997 made Gurmit a popular icon, not only in Singapore, but also in neighbouring countries (especially Malaysia). This factor leads to having a spin-off sitcom sequel based in Malaysia, Phua Chu Kang Sdn Bhd (2009-2010).

In 2013, Gurmit was nominated for the Best Actor prize at the 1st Golden Wau Awards, aimed at promoting Chinese-language Malaysian films, for his role in Phua Chu Kang The Movie (2010).

In October 2014, the Madame Tussauds Singapore museum unveiled a wax figure of Phua Chu Kang.

In November 2014, Gurmit announced that he would leave the entertainment industry at the end of his full-time television career at Mediacorp - after exactly 20 years. Gurmit shared that he planned to spend more time with his family and would take on engagements on a more selective basis.

In August 2020, Phua Chu Kang was announced and signed as Shopee's first Singaporean brand ambassador.

Filmography

Film

Television

Skit & Entertainment

Others

Accolades

Discography

Albums
 Sing Singapore 2002 : One (We Are One) (2002) duet with Tay Ping Hui
 One Leg Kicking Original Soundtrack: 'Calling': "Into The House" (2001)
 Moments Gurmit's debut album (2015)
 Gurmit Goes Local (1995) comedy album

Compilations
 A Happy Journey Starts Like That! (2009)
 The PCK Sar-vivor Rap (2003)
 Love, No Boundaries: "Into the House" (2001) [album single]

References

External links 
 

Singaporean television personalities
1965 births
Living people
Singaporean Charismatics
Singaporean people of Indian descent
Singaporean people of Punjabi descent
Singaporean people of Japanese descent
Singaporean people of Chinese descent
Singaporean male television actors
Singaporean male stage actors
Singaporean male film actors
Converts to Christianity from Sikhism
20th-century Singaporean male actors
21st-century Singaporean male actors